The 2010 GCC U-17 Championship took place in Kuwait between September 21, 2010 and September 30, 2010.  The GCC U-17 Championship took place for the sixth time in which six nations have entered.

UAE were the defending champion and won the event for the third time.

Groups

Group stage

Group A

All times are local (UTC+3)

Group B

All times are local (UTC+3)

Semifinals

Fifth place playoff

Third place playoff

Final

Winners

See also 
Football at the Southeast Asian Games
AFC
AFC Asian Cup
East Asian Cup
Arabian Gulf Cup
South Asian Football Federation Cup
West Asian Football Federation Championship

Gulf
2010
Gulf
GCC U-17 Championship
2010 in youth association football